The discography of American country music group The Statler Brothers consists of 37 studio albums, 18 compilation albums, three live albums, 83 singles, and 14 music videos. The group debuted in 1965 with "Flowers on the Wall", a number two Billboard Hot Country Songs and number four Hot 100 hit. Although they never made top 40 on the Hot 100 again, The Statler Brothers continued to chart on Hot Country Songs until 1990, reaching number one with "Do You Know You Are My Sunshine" in 1978, "Elizabeth" in 1984, and "My Only Love" and "Too Much on My Heart", both in 1985.

All studio albums listed have been issued on compact disc at some point, with the exception of Harold, Lew, Phil and Don; Short Stories; The Originals; and The Legend Goes On. The first eight Mercury titles (not counting the album released under the Lester "Roadhog" Moran and the Cadillac Cowboys moniker) were made available in a box-set release titled The Complete Original Albums Collection (2012); this marked the first CD appearance of five of those albums.

Studio albums

1960s and 1970s

1980s

1990s and 2000s

Compilation albums

Live albums

Singles

1960s

1970s

1980s

1990s and 2000s

Music videos

See also
Jimmy Fortune
Lew DeWitt

Notes

References

Statler Brothers, The
Discographies of American artists